Edmund de Livera was a Ceylonese journalist. He was the editor of The Times of Ceylon and composer of the College Song of S. Thomas' College, Mt Lavinia

He was educated at the Colombo Academy.

References

Sri Lankan journalists
Alumni of Royal College, Colombo
Year of birth missing
Year of death missing